Events from the year 1722 in art.

Events
 Foundation of the first public theatre in Denmark, Lille Grönnegade.

Paintings

 William Aikman – Portrait of the Scottish poet Allan Ramsay
 William Kent – Ceiling of Cupola Room, Kensington Palace
 Sir Godfrey Kneller – Portrait of Thomas Coningsby and his daughters Margaret and Frances
 Nicolas Lancret – La Fête dans un Bois
 Tiepolo – The Martyrdom of St. Bartholomew
 Maria Verelst – The Dowager Duchess of Marlborough with Lady Diana Spencer (approximate date)

Births
 March 6 – Johann Christian Brand, Austrian painter (died 1795)
 May 25 - Anton Čebej – Slovenian painter (d. c. 1774)
 July 16 – Joseph Wilton, English sculptor and a founding member of the Royal Academy (died 1803)
 August 12 – Giuseppe Baldrighi, Italian painter (died 1803)
 September 2 – Vigilius Eriksen, Danish painter and royal portraitist (died 1782)
 October 3 – Johann Heinrich Tischbein, member of the Tischbein family of German painters (died 1789)
 November 30 – Theodore Gardelle, painter and enameller (died 1761)
 date unknown
 Francesco Battaglioli, Italian painter of veduta and capriccios (died 1796)
 Dominic Serres "the Elder", French-born marine painter (died 1793)

Deaths
 January 7 – Antoine Coypel, French painter (born 1661)
 March 12 – Christian Berentz, German artist (born 1658)
 April 12 - Antonio Zanchi, Italian painter of canvases for churches in Venice (born 1631)
 May 4 – Claude Gillot, French painter, engraver, book illustrator, metal worker, and theatrical designer (born 1673)
 May 19 – Jan Karel Donatus van Beecq, Dutch painter (born 1638)
 May 23 - Pierre Aveline, French engraver, print-publisher and print-seller (born 1656)
 June 10 – Francescantonio Coratoli, Italian painter of frescoes (born 1671)
 August 7 – Johann Georg Beck, German engraver (born 1676)
 November 12 – Adriaen van der Werff, Dutch painter of portraits and erotic, devotional and mythological scenes (born 1659)
 November 21 - Sebastiaen van Aken, Flemish historical painter (born 1648)
 date unknown
 Marziale Carpinoni, Italian painter (born c.1644)
 Filippo Tancredi, Italian painter of church frescoes (born 1655)
 Ma Yuanyu, Chinese painter during the Qing Dynasty (born c.1669)

 
Years of the 18th century in art
1720s in art